Several Indian women have participated in the Olympics over the years. Seven women from India have won an Olympic medal so far. They are Karnam Malleswari, Mary Kom, Saina Nehwal, P. V. Sindhu (twice), Sakshi Malik, Saikhom Mirabai Chanu and Lovlina Borgohain.

The first Indian woman to ever win an Olympic medal was Karnam Malleswari, who won a bronze medal at the 2000 Sydney Olympics in the Women's 69 kg category in Weightlifting.

In the 2012 London Olympics, women's boxing was featured as a sport for the first time. India was represented by five-time world champion Mary Kom who was the only Indian to qualify for the event. However, she lost to Nicola Adams of the UK in the semi-final. She thus earned herself an Olympic bronze medal. Saina Nehwal became the first Indian to win a medal in Badminton at the Olympics, by winning the bronze medal at the London Olympics 2012 on 4 August 2012. Geeta Phogat became the first ever Indian woman to qualify for the women's 55 kg wrestling in the London Olympics 2012. Women's wrestling was announced in 2004.

At the 2016 Rio Olympics, P. V. Sindhu became the first ever Indian woman to win a silver medal at the Olympics. She reached the Women's singles badminton final, which she lost to Carolina Marín of Spain on 19 August 2016. She also became the youngest Indian to win an Olympic medal. At the same Olympics, Sakshi Malik became the first Indian woman to win a medal in Wrestling. She won the bronze medal in Women's 58 kg freestyle wrestling. This was the first Olympics for India where all the medallists (2) were women.

P. V. Sindhu, Saikhom Mirabai Chanu and Lovlina Borgohain made India proud by winning medals at the 2020 Tokyo Olympics. Saikhom Mirabai Chanu won the silver medal on the very first day of the Tokyo Olympics 2020, where she achieved the second position after the total count of both Snatch and Clean & Jerk. Her highest lift at Snatch was 87 kg and at Clean & Jerk, she was able to lift 115 kg, making her overall score 202 kg. P. V. Sindhu became the first Indian woman to win two Olympic medals. Following up on her silver medal in Rio 2016, she secured the bronze medal in Tokyo 2020 by defeating China's He Bingjiao 21–13, 21–15 in two straight games. Lovlina Borgohain won her first Olympic medal in Women's welterweight boxing, where she assured herself a medal after she defeated Taiwan's Chen Nien-Chin in the quarterfinals. However, in the semifinals, she lost to Busenaz Sürmeneli of Turkey, earning herself the bronze medal.

List of medalists

References 

Articles created or expanded during Women's History Month (India) - 2014
 Olympics, Indian women
Women Olympians, India